Anthony George Booth (9 October 1931 – 25 September 2017) was an English actor, best known for his role as Mike Rawlins in the BBC series Till Death Us Do Part. He was the father-in-law of former Prime Minister Tony Blair and the widower of Coronation Street star Pat Phoenix, marrying her a few days before her death in 1986.

Early life
Booth was born into a working-class family in Jubilee Road, Liverpool, in 1931 and raised Catholic. His mother was a Roman Catholic of Irish descent, and his father was a merchant seaman during World War II and Catholic convert. Tony Booth attended St Edmund's Infants School and spent a year in hospital as a child with diphtheria. He then passed the Eleven-plus examination and attended St Mary's College, Crosby, where he was awarded a bursary to cover the cost of his books.

His hopes of going to university were dashed when he had to leave school and get a job after his father was badly injured in an industrial accident. He then worked as a clerk in a docklands warehouse and at the United States Consulate in Liverpool, before being called up for national service with the Royal Corps of Signals.

Acting
Booth developed a taste for acting when posted in the Army to SHAPE in Paris. He spent five years in repertory theatre, before appearing in films and television during the 1960s. He played roles in over twenty films, including The L-Shaped Room (1962), Corruption (1968), The Girl with a Pistol (1968), Brannigan (1975), Priest (1994) and Owd Bob (1997). He appeared early in the run of the television series Coronation Street in 1960 and in an episode of The Avengers, but it was his role as the left-wing son-in-law in Till Death Us Do Part (1965) that brought him recognition.

Booth made guest appearances in many other television series. He starred alongside Robin Askwith in the Confessions of ... British sex comedy film series as Sidney Noggett between 1974 and 1977. These were Confessions of a Window Cleaner, Confessions of a Pop Performer, Confessions of a Driving Instructor and Confessions from a Holiday Camp.

From 1985 to 1986, Booth appeared as pub landlord Ted Pilkington in the short-lived ITV soap Albion Market. He starred in the 1998 short film The Duke, playing an elderly man who tells his adoring grandson that he is John Wayne. In 2001, Booth appeared in several episodes of Family Affairs playing Barry Hurst, Sadie Hargreaves' brother-in-law.

Booth played a tramp named Nobby Stuart in a special two-hander episode of EastEnders. In 2007, he also played a tramp called Errol Michaels in Emmerdale. Both of these characters played the purpose of a spiritual guide to a down-and-out character, in EastEnders, Alfie Moon (Shane Richie) and in Emmerdale, Bob Hope (Tony Audenshaw).

Personal life
Booth was married four times and had eight daughters by five women. By his first wife Gale Howard, he had two daughters, Cherie and Lyndsey. Cherie, a King’s Counsel, is married to the former Prime Minister Tony Blair. While Booth was a long-standing supporter of the Labour Party, his politics differed from that of his daughter and her husband.

Booth nearly burned to death in November 1979 when, during a drunken attempt to get into his locked flat, he fell into a drum of paraffin. He spent six months in hospital and needed 26 skin graft operations. Shortly after his discharge from hospital, he went to visit an 'old flame', Coronation Street actress Pat Phoenix. She took him in and nursed him back to full health, and they lived together for six years. Phoenix's own health subsequently declined, and the pair married a few days before her death from lung cancer in 1986.

With his third wife, Nancy Jaeger, he had a daughter, Joanna.

Booth had five other daughters with partners he did not marry. He left Gale, his first wife, in 1961 for Julia Allan, with whom he had two daughters Jenia and Bronwen. He had a daughter, Lucy Thomas in 1967 with Ann Gannon, who worked in radio sales, after a brief relationship; this did not become known publicly until 2002. His relationship with Pamela Smith, which began in the 1960s, lasted 13 years; the couple had Booth's other two daughters, Emma and Lauren Booth, a broadcaster and journalist.

In 2006 he said he was the victim of anti-English bias while living in Ireland.

Booth was diagnosed with Alzheimer's disease in 2004. He suffered a stroke in 2010. He also had chronic heart failure and chronic obstructive pulmonary disease. Booth died on 25 September 2017 at home, aged 85.

In March 2019, Booth's widow Steph published the book Married to Alzheimer's: A Life Less Ordinary with Tony Booth, a memoir about her time caring for her husband.

Filmography
 Suspect (1960) – Parkin
 Pit of Darkness (1961) – Ted
 The Valiant (1962)
 Mix Me a Person (1962) – at 'La Paloma' / Gravy
 The L-Shaped Room (1962) – Youth in Street
 The Partner (1963) – Buddy Forrester
 The Hi-Jackers (1963) – Terry McKinley
 Of Human Bondage (1964) – Martin (uncredited)
 The Saint, The Rhine Maiden (1965) - Hans
 The Return of Mr. Moto (1965) – Hovath
 The Saint, The Russian Prisoner (1966) - Pyotr
 The Girl with the Pistol (1968) – John
 Corruption (1968) – Mike Orme
 Till Death Us Do Part (1969) – Mike Rawlins (the boyfriend)
 The Exorcism of Hugh (1972) – Delamare
 Adolf Hitler: My Part in His Downfall (1973) – Tommy Brettell
 Montreal Main (1974)
 Confessions of a Window Cleaner (1974) – Sidney Noggett
 Brannigan (1975) – Freddy
 Confessions of a Pop Performer (1975) – Sidney Noggett
 Confessions of a Driving Instructor (1976) – Sidney Noggett
 Confessions from a Holiday Camp (1977) – Sidney Noggett
 Confessions from the David Galaxy Affair (1979) – Steve
 Priest (1994) – Tommy
 Owd Bob (1998) – Tammas
 The Duke (1998)
 Treasure Island (1999) – Chief Revenue Officer
 Revengers Tragedy (2002) – Lord Antonio
 Upstaged (2005) – Candidate – Leggings
 Gone to the Dogs (2006) – Jack
 Sources:

Memoirs
 Tony Booth, Stroll On (1989)
 Tony Booth, A Labour of Love (1997)
 Tony Booth, What's Left? (2002)

References

External links
 Anthony Booth at the British Film Institute
 

1931 births
2017 deaths
Deaths from Alzheimer's disease
Deaths from dementia in England
English male film actors
English male soap opera actors
English people of Irish descent
Male actors from Liverpool
People educated at St Mary's College, Crosby
People from Crosby, Merseyside
Royal Corps of Signals soldiers
20th-century British Army personnel